Lichfield Cathedral School is a private day school in the city of Lichfield, Staffordshire, England. It traces its lineage to the 14th century when Lichfield Cathedral made provisions to educate its choristers. The school in its current form now educates over 400 boys and girls from nursery to sixth form. While the school still serves its primary purpose of educating choristers of the cathedral, it is open to pupils of all faiths.

History
Since the earliest days of its choral foundation, which can be traced back as far as the early 14th century, the Cathedral has made provision for the appointment and education of boy choristers. Choristers were housed and educated at Dam Street, just outside the Cathedral Close. After the start of World War II, the Dean and chapter decided to formally establish a school. St Chad's Cathedral School, as this independent preparatory school for boys was known, was opened on 27 January 1942. During the first ten years, the school experienced much growth and was in need of larger facilities. In 1953, it moved to the Bishop's Palace, its current location.

Girls were admitted to the school for the first time in 1974. In 1981, the School became a financially independent Charitable Trust and took on its new name, Lichfield Cathedral School. A pre-preparatory department was established in St Mary's School on the far side of Minster Pool in 1982. By 1988, the pre-prep had outgrown St Mary's and moved to its own premises. The School acquired St. John's Preparatory School in Longdon Greenin 2006, and the two schools amalgamated. The Pre-Prep (Junior School, aged 3 – 8) is now situated on the Longdon site, and the vacated space in the Close has been adapted for older year groups and specialist teaching. In September 2010, the school accepted its first sixth form pupils.

In March 2012, a fire broke out in one of the main buildings and damaged an office. The school was commended by the Fire Services for their prompt action and coordination of the evacuation.

Houses
Each pupil is assigned to a house upon entry. The houses are named after famous people associated with Lichfield.

Music
The Cathedral School is noted for its strong musical tradition. In 2011, the Cathedral Choir broadcast their Christmas Day Eucharist live on BBC One and most recently, they sang live on BBC Radio 3 for its Evensong programme. At age 13, boys whose voices have changed may receive music scholarships at the school or elsewhere. A new girls' choir was started in 2006 for girls aged 10 to 14, and more recently the choir was admitted into the cathedral's choral foundation.

Notable alumni
Guy N. Smith, writer mainly of horror fiction.

References

External links
School Website
Profile on ISC website

Choir schools in England
Private schools in Staffordshire
Educational institutions established in the 14th century
Cathedral School
Cathedral schools
Church of England private schools in the Diocese of Lichfield
School